This page details the qualifying process for the 1986 African Cup of Nations in Egypt. Egypt, as hosts, and Cameroon, as title holders, qualified automatically.

Qualifying tournament
 qualified as holders
 qualified as hosts

Preliminary round

|}

Tanzania won 3–2 on aggregate.

Mozambique won 3–0 on aggregate.

Zimbabwe won 8–1 on aggregate.

Kenya won 4–3 on penalty shootout after 1–1 on aggregate.

Zaire won 3–1 on aggregate.

Mauritania won 4–3 on aggregate.

Mali won 3–2 on aggregate.

Sierra Leone won 4–3 on aggregate.

First round

|}

Zimbabwe won 6–2 on aggregate.

Algeria won 5–1 on aggregate.

Libya won 2–1 on aggregate.

Ghana won 5–2 on aggregate.

Ivory Coast won 7–1 on aggregate.

Mozambique won 6–5 on penalty shootout after 2–2 on aggregate.

Senegal won 2–1 on aggregate.

Zaire won 5–2 on aggregate.

Kenya advanced after Sudan withdrew.

Morocco advanced after Sierra Leone withdrew.

Nigeria advanced after Tanzania withdrew.

Zambia advanced after Ethiopia withdrew.

Second round

|}

Algeria won 3–0 on aggregate.

Zambia won 1–0 on aggregate.

Ivory Coast won 2–0 on aggregate.

Senegal won 3–1 on aggregate.

Mozambique won 4–3 on penalty shootout after 3–3 on aggregate.

Morocco won 1–0 on aggregate.

Qualifying Teams

References

External links
 African Nations Cup 1986

Qual
1986
qualification